Quinsachata (possibly from Aymara and Quechua kimsa three, Pukina chata mountain, "three mountains") is a mountain in the Vilcanota mountain range in the Andes of Peru, about  high. It is located in the Cusco Region, Quispicanchi Province, Marcapata District. Quinsachata is situated north of the lake Singrenacocha, northeast of the mountain Chumpe and northwest of the Aquichua.

References 

Mountains of Peru
Mountains of Cusco Region